Casino Tycoon 2 is a 1992 Hong Kong action drama film written, produced and directed by Wong Jing and starring Andy Lau and Chingmy Yau.  It is the sequel to Casino Tycoon.

Summary
Andy Lau returns in his role as the Casino Tycoon of Macau, Benny Ho. We join Ho 18 years after the last film as he has established his Casino empire in Macau and is living with his daughter and wife. When his daughter brings home a young man eager to make headway in the Casino empire Ho becomes embroiled in a plot to destroy his family.

Cast
 Andy Lau as Benny Ho (based on Stanley Ho)
 Chingmy Yau as Mui
 Joey Wong as Vivian Ching (guest star)
 Alex Man as Kwok Ying-nam (guest star; based on Henry Fok)
 Michelle Reis as Tik Wan (guest star)
 Remos Choi as Ching Chan
 Vivian Chan as Ho Tin-yee
 Lau Siu-ming as Nip Ngo-tin
 Benz Hui as Ko Ming
 Sandra Ng as Chu Lam-lam (cameo; based on Loletta Chu)
 Calvin Choi as Ho Tin-po (cameo)
 Edmond So as Ting (cameo; based on Timothy Fok)
 Newton Lai as Tik Wan's boyfriend (based on Patrick Tse)
 John Ching as Niu Pit
 Lee Siu-kei as Ho Piu
 Kingdom Yuen as Sin
 Dennis Chan as Master Ho

References

External links

1992 films
1990s action drama films
Hong Kong action drama films
Films about gambling
1990s Cantonese-language films
Films directed by Wong Jing
Films set in Macau
Films set in Hawaii
1992 drama films
1990s Hong Kong films